Belie is a cover album by Japanese singer Akina Nakamori. It was released on 30 November 2016 under the Universal Music Group Japan label. The album was released a year and two months later, after another cover album "Utahime4: My Eggs Benedict".

Release History
The CD was released in three editions: regular CD edition and first-press CD=DVD edition. DVD footage includes full music videoclips for all 10 cover songs. One month later, was released limited edition Belie+Vampire only in Vinyl edition. The Vampire EP includes cover songs as well which was at the first meant only in the limited copies, however during the year of 35th debut anniversary celebration, 3 May 2017 was released as a solo mini ep Vampire.

Chart performance
Belie debuted at number 8 on the Oricon Album Weekly Chart and charted for 9 weeks and sold over 22,800 copies. On the monthly charts it remained at number 27. On digital streaming service Recochoku's charts, the album debuted at number 5 on Digital Album Daily Charts.

Track listing

Bellie

Vampire

References

2016 albums
Japanese-language albums
Akina Nakamori albums
Universal Music Japan albums